Coatomer subunit zeta-1 is a protein that in humans is encoded by the COPZ1 gene.

Interactions 

COPZ1 has been shown to interact with COPG.

References

External links

Further reading